Blount's disease (or Blount disease) is a growth disorder of the tibia (shin bone) which causes the lower leg to angle inward, resembling a bowleg. It is also known as "tibia vara".

Signs and symptoms

Cause
Blount disease is a growth disorder of the shin bone which causes the lower leg to angle inward, resembling a bowleg. It can present in boys under 4-years in both legs, or in adolescents usually on one side. Causes are thought to be genetic and environmental, like obesity, African-American lineage, and early walkers.

Diagnosis

Differential Diagnosis
Lower extremity deformities in Rickets can closely mimic those produced by Blount's disease. To differentiate between Rickets and Blount's disease it is important to correlate the clinical picture with laboratory findings such as calcium, phosphorus and alkaline phosphatase. Besides the X-ray appearance. Bone deformities in Rickets have a reasonable likelihood to correct over time, while this is not the case with Blount's disease. Nevertheless, both disorders may need surgical intervention in the form of bone osteotomy or more commonly guided growth surgery. Osteochondrodysplasias or genetic bone diseases can cause lower extremity deformities similar to Blount's disease. The clinical appearance and the characteristic radiographic are important to confirm the diagnosis.

Treatment
Children who develop severe bowing before the age of 3 may be treated with knee ankle foot orthoses. However, bracing may fail, or bowing may not be detected until the child is older. Bracing should be started by 3 years of age. In some cases, surgery may be performed.

Blount disease is one of the 8 severe comorbidities of severe obesity (BMI >35), which are an indication for bariatric surgery in children per a 2019 policy statement of the American Academy of Pediatrics.
The other severe comorbidities are: obstructive sleep apnea (Apnea-Hypopnea Index > .5), Type2 Diabetes mellitus, idiopathic intracranial hypertension (IIH), nonalcoholic steatohepatitis, SCFE, GERD, and hypertension.

Etymology
Blount disease is named after Walter Putnam Blount (1900–1992), an American pediatric orthopedic surgeon, who described it in 1937. It has also been known as Mau-Nilsonne Syndrome, after C. Mau and H. Nilsonne, who published early case reports of the condition. it is today considered an acquired disease of the proximal tibial metaphysis rather than an epiphyseal dysplasia or osteochondrosis.

References

External links 
Dakshina Murthy T S. S; Alessandro De Leucio. Blount Disease Treasure Island (FL): StatPearls Publishing; 2022 Jan-.

Skeletal disorders
Orthopedic problems
Knee injuries and disorders
Pediatrics
Syndromes affecting bones